Lieutenant General Surinder Singh Mahal  is a serving general officer in the Indian Army, and the incumbent General Officer Commanding-in-Chief of the Army Training Command (ARTRAC) since April 2022.

Biography
From Kathgarh village in Nawanshahar District, Punjab, Mahal was commissioned in the 41st Armoured Regiment in December 1984. After commanding II Corps at Ambala, he commanded the Uttar Bharat (UB) Area before his appointment as GOC-in-C, ARTRAC.

Dates of rank

References

Living people
Indian generals
National Defence Academy (India) alumni
Indian Military Academy alumni
Recipients of the Ati Vishisht Seva Medal
Recipients of the Vishisht Seva Medal
Military personnel from Punjab, India
Year of birth missing (living people)
Defence Services Staff College alumni
Academic staff of the Defence Services Staff College